San Nicolás Santa Eugenia Airport is an airport  north of San Nicolás, a town in the Bío Bío Region of Chile.

See also

Transport in Chile
List of airports in Chile

References

External links
OpenStreetMap - Santa Eugenia Airport
OurAirports - Santa Eugenia Airport
FallingRain - Santa Eugenia Airport

Airports in Chile
Airports in Ñuble Region